Richard Langford (died 1580), of Ludlow, Shropshire and Bristol, was an English merchant and politician.

Family
He married Elizabeth née Rogers and they had three sons and three daughters.

Career
He was a Member (MP) of the Parliament of England for Ludlow in 1563.

References

Year of birth missing
1580 deaths
English MPs 1563–1567
Businesspeople from Ludlow
Politicians from Ludlow